Vladimir Dmitriyevich Kazantsev (6 January 1923 – 22 November 2007) was a Russian long-distance runner who won a silver medal in the 3000 m steeplechase at the 1952 Olympics. He set world's best times in this event in 1951 and 1952 and won the Soviet title in 1950–53. In the Olympic final he had a 20 m lead with 700 m remaining but injured a tendon in a bad landing after a water jump and was overtaken by Horace Ashenfelter.

Ashenfelter was an FBI agent, while Kazantsev was a KGB officer who retired in the rank of lieutenant colonel. He fought as a private in the German-Soviet War at the Kalinin Front, was wounded in action in 1942, and awarded the Order of the Patriotic War. Besides his KGB service Kazantsev taught physical education at the Soviet Police Academy and worked as an athletics coach, preparing the Soviet team to the 1964 Olympics.

References

1923 births
2007 deaths
People from Khvalynsky Uyezd
People from Saratov Oblast
Honoured Masters of Sport of the USSR
Recipients of the Order of the Red Banner of Labour
Soviet male long-distance runners
Soviet male middle-distance runners
Olympic silver medalists for the Soviet Union
Athletes (track and field) at the 1952 Summer Olympics
Olympic athletes of the Soviet Union
Dynamo sports society athletes
Soviet military personnel of World War II
Soviet male steeplechase runners
Medalists at the 1952 Summer Olympics
Olympic silver medalists in athletics (track and field)